Ben Nelson is a U.S. Senator from Nebraska.

Ben Nelson may also refer to:

Ben Nelson (businessman), founder of Minerva Project and University and former head of Snapfish.com
Ben Nelson (Australian footballer) (born 1977), AFL and SANFL Australian rules footballer
Ben Nelson (footballer, born 2004), association football player
Ben Nelson (American football) (born 1979), American football player

See also
Benjamin Nelson (1911–1977), American sociologist